Events from the year 1918 in France.

Incumbents
President: Raymond Poincaré 
President of the Council of Ministers: Georges Clemenceau

Events
21 March – Operation Michael begins in the vicinity of Saint-Quentin, launching Germany's Spring Offensive.
27 May – The Third Battle of the Aisne begins, an attempt by the Germans to capture the Chemin des Dames Ridge before the arrival of the American Expeditionary Force to support France.
1 June – The Battle of Belleau Wood begins, near the Marne River.
6 June – Third Battle of the Aisne ends with the German advance halted after initial gains.
26 June – Battle of Belleau Wood ends in Allied victory.
15 July – The Second Battle of the Marne begins, the last major German offensive on the Western Front.
18 July-22 July – The Battle of Soissons is fought between the French (with American assistance) and German armies.
5 August – Second Battle of the Marne ends with Allied victory.
8 August – Battle of Amiens begins.
12 September – British victory in Battle of Havrincourt.
12 September-15 September – Battle of Saint-Mihiel, Allied victory.
18 September – British victory in the Battle of Épehy.
8 October-10 October – The Battle of Cambrai ends in a decisive Allied victory.
7 November – The Anglo-French Declaration is signed between France and the United Kingdom, agreeing to implement a "complete and final liberation" of countries that had been part of the Ottoman Empire.
11 November – Battle of Amiens ends, when the armistice is signed.

Births
6 February – Marcel Mouly, artist (died 2008)
25 April – Alain Savary, politician and Minister (died 1988)
25 April – Gérard de Vaucouleurs, astronomer (died 1995)
11 May – Roger Trézel, bridge player (died 1986)
26 June – Roger Voisin, trumpeter (died 2008)
26 August – Marcel Bleibtreu, Trotskyist activist and theorist (died 2001)
31 August – Camille Bonnet, rugby union player (died 2020)
14 September – Paul Bonneau, composer (died 1995)
30 September – René Rémond, historian and political economist (died 2007)
6 October – André Pilette, motor racing driver (died 1993)
16 October – Louis Althusser, Marxist philosopher (died 1990)
22 October – René de Obaldia, playwright (died 2022)
7 November – Paul Aussaresses, general (died 2013)
8 December – Gérard Souzay, baritone (died 2004)
16 December – Pierre Delanoë, songwriter/lyricist (died 2006)
30 December – Lucien Leduc, soccer player and manager (died 2004)

Full date unknown
Madeleine Giteau, historian (died 2005)
Gilbert Martineau, author and curator of the French properties on St Helena (died 1995)

Deaths
9 January – Charles-Émile Reynaud, science teacher, responsible for the first animated films (born 1844)
 23 March — Hans Gottfried von Häbler, World War I German flying ace (born 1893)
25 March – Claude Debussy, composer (born 1862)
25 August – Henri Chantavoine, writer (born 1850)
5 October – Roland Garros, aviator and World War I fighter pilot (born 1888)
12 October – Émile Étienne Guimet, industrialist, traveller and connoisseur (born 1836)
13 October – Marcel Deprez, electrical engineer (born 1843)
9 November – Guillaume Apollinaire, poet, writer and art critic (born 1880)
3 December – Étienne Destot, radiologist and anatomist (born 1864)
22 December – Philippe Alexandre Jules Künckel d'Herculais, entomologist (born 1843)

Full date unknown
Thérèse Humbert, fraudster (born 1856)

See also
 List of French films of 1918

References

1910s in France